Rhodri Lloyd (born 22 July 1993) is a Welsh professional rugby league footballer who plays as a  forward for the Swinton Lions in the Betfred Championship and Wales at international level.  

He has played at representative level for Wales, and at club level for the Wigan Warriors and the London Broncos in the Super League,
He is also a secondary school teacher at the prestigious gates of st bedes catholic high school as a pe teacher.

Background
Lloyd was born in Penpedairheol, Caerphilly, Wales.  

Higher Education:- He then studied Sports Studies at the University of Central Lancashire, graduating in 2019.

Playing career
A junior player with South Wales Scorpions, Lloyd joined Wigan in 2012 and made his Super League début in the same season. He attended Ysgol Gyfun Cwm Rhymni a Welsh language secondary school in Caerphilly county.

In January 2014, he joined Widnes on loan.
In February 2015, he joined Swinton on loan. In February the following year (2016) he resigned for Swinton on a permanent basis.
Lloyd now  has two play off final victories to his name, 2015 and 2022, the latter captaining the Swinton Lions to success.

International honours
Lloyd made his début for Wales against Italy in 2010 while just 17 years old. In doing so, he became the youngest ever player to win a senior cap for Wales. In 2013, Lloyd played in the 2013 Rugby League World Cup. He scored his first ever international try against Italy on the opening day of the tournament. He went on to score another try later on in the tournament. In October 2015, Lloyd played in the 2015 European Cup. In October 2016, Lloyd played in the 2017 World Cup qualifiers, he also captained the side in a friendly against Jamaica in Wakefield. He was selected in the Wales 9s squad for the 2019 Rugby League World Cup 9s.
On 19 October 2022, Lloyd scored the opening try of Wales 2021 Rugby League World Cup campaign against the Cook Islands. Wales would narrowly lose the match 18-12.

References

External links
Swinton Lions profile
(archived by web.archive.org) Swinton profile
(archived by web.archive.org) Statistics at rlwc2017.com
Wales profile
Welsh profile

1993 births
Living people
Crusaders Rugby League players
Leigh Leopards players
London Broncos players
Rugby league players from Caerphilly County Borough
Rugby league second-rows
South Wales Scorpions players
Swinton Lions captains
Swinton Lions players
Wales national rugby league team players
Welsh rugby league players
Whitehaven R.L.F.C. players
Widnes Vikings players
Wigan Warriors players
Workington Town players